FPLA may refer to:

 Fair Packaging and Labeling Act – a United States law that applies to labels on many consumer products
 Field-programmable logic array – a type of semiconductor device better known as field-programmable gate array (FPGA)
 Popular Liberation Front of Azawad (in French: Front Populaire de Libération de l'Azawad) – a militant rebel group in northern Mali
 Free-piston linear alternator – essentially a linear motor used as an electrical generator